The Climate Museum is a nonprofit organization in New York City and the first museum dedicated to climate change and climate solutions in the United States. Its mission is "to inspire action on the climate crisis with programming across the arts and sciences that deepens understanding, builds connections, and advances just solutions." The Climate Museum presents free exhibitions, art installations, youth programs and other public programs at pop-up locations in New York City, its seasonal at its seasonal exhibition hub on Governors Island, in public spaces citywide, and through virtual events.

History 
The Climate Museum initiative was conceived of in the aftermath of Superstorm Sandy. Climate Museum founder and director Miranda Massie was at the time serving as the Interim Director of the New York Lawyers for the Public Interest (NYLPI). Her work in civil rights led her to see climate change through the lens of social activism. Massie left NYLPI in March 2014 to found the Climate Museum Launch Project. The Museum was granted a five-year charter by the State of New York in July 2015, and received 501(c)3 nonprofit status in February 2016.

The Climate Museum is part of the Museums and Climate Change Working Group, a coalition of museums around the world working to incorporate climate change into their exhibitions and programming.

Exhibitions and arts initiatives 
The Climate Museum's first exhibition, In Human Time, was presented at the Sheila C. Johnson Design Center at Parsons School of Design, The New School from December 2017 to February 2018. It explored intersections of polar ice, humanity, and time through installations of work by artists Zaria Forman and Peggy Weil.

In September 2018, the Climate Museum launched the citywide, outdoor public art installation Climate Signals by Justin Brice Guariglia. This installation ran through November 2018 and consisted of 10 solar-powered highway signs in New York City parks across all five boroughs, programmed to flash messages about climate in five languages at passersby. It was presented in partnership with the NYC Mayor's Office Climate Policy and Programs. The exhibition was accompanied by numerous special events co-presented with community partners.

From September 2018 to October 2018, the Climate Museum operated its first temporary space on Governors Island at the Admiral's House. The space included the exhibition Climate Changers of New York, a portrait exhibition by David Noles presented in partnership with the NYC Climate Action Alliance, and a digital interactive activity, "Create Your Own Climate Signal." Throughout Fall 2018, the Climate Museum offered programming in the arts, science education, community engagement, as well as screenings, panels and talks.

Taking Action was the Climate Museum's second exhibition on Governors Island and ran from June to October 2019. The exhibition included information about clean energy and other mitigation strategies, the obstacles blocking the transition to a carbon-free economy and culture, and the ways museum visitors could take collective climate action to overcome the social, political, and financial barriers to implementing climate solutions.

In the fall of 2021 the Museum presented Low Relief for High Water, a one-day sculptural installation and performance piece by New York City artist Gabriela Salazar presented in Washington Square Park. The artist deconstructed casts of her childhood home's windows made from water-soluble paper, distributing the pieces of the sculpture to audience members. A film about the piece, produced and edited by Micah Fink Films, is set to debut in 2022.

From July 2021 through March 2022 the Climate Museum ran a poster campaign entitled Beyond Lies that explored the culpability of the fossil fuel industry in delaying climate action. The Beyond Lies posters were designed by illustrator Mona Chalabi and included a QR code with steps for viewers to call their Congressional representatives.

In October 2022, the Climate Museum opened its first pop-up space in Soho, Manhattan, open through March 2023. The exhibition includes a new work of climate art called Someday, all this by David Opdyke. It also presents social science research and opportunities for visitors to take climate action.

Panel discussions and dialogue events 

In October 2020 - November 2021 the Museum launched an online discussion series, Talking Climate, that explored different themes at the intersection of climate and inequality: displacement, grief, infrastructure, identity, food, law, health, and labor. Talking Climate 2022 was announced in early 2022 with a new focus on climate arts and culture.

The Museum has hosted panel discussions, interviews, and presentations online and in person since 2017. Guest speakers and panelists have included Eddie Bautista, Kizzy Charles-Guzman, Jeff Goodell, Ed Maibach, Jacqui Patterson, Somini Sengupta, Peggy Shepard, Sarah Stillman, Olúfẹ́mi O. Táíwò, and Amy Westervelt.

Youth programming 

From March to June 2019, in partnership with the NYC Department of Education's (DOE) Office of Sustainability, the Climate Museum offered a citywide spoken word program for high school students called Climate Speaks. The program culminated in a final performance at the Apollo Theater on June 14, 2019.

In April 2020 the Museum began its Climate Art for Congress initiative, an art, writing, and civics project.[29]In this program, K-12 students from across the United States create illustrated notes to their congressional representatives about their climate concerns and priorities. The Climate Museum publishes an online gallery of all submissions on its website.

In the summer of 2021 the Climate Museum initiated its Climate Action Leadership Program. In this program, students from across the United States (with the largest number from the New York Metropolitan area) participate in workshops, internships, and volunteer opportunities at the Museum and with partner organizations.

At the Climate Museum Pop-Up in 2022 and at its exhibition Taking Action in 2019, the Climate Museum offered a High School Internship in which students volunteered as exhibition docents.

Governance and Funding 

As of 2022, the Climate Museum's Board of Trustees consists of eight members: Chair Peter Knight, Vice Chair Cynthia Rosenzweig, Treasurer Hector Gonzalez, Secretary Joel Towers, Jacqueline Patterson, Alan Steel, and Sarah Weinheimer. 

The Climate Museum received a platinum rating from Candid in 2021 and 2022. The Museum does not accept donations from fossil companies, from those affiliated with the fossil fuel industry, or from sources otherwise not consonant with its mission.

The Climate Museum has received funding from the New York State Council on the Arts, the New York City Department of Cultural Affairs, the Rockefeller Brothers Fund, and the Andrew W. Mellon Foundation.

References

External links 
 

Proposed museums in the United States
Science museums in New York City
Proposed buildings and structures in New York City